"Double Shot (Of My Baby's Love)" is a song first recorded by Dick Holler & the Holidays, written by Don Smith and Cyril Vetter. It was later recorded by the Swingin' Medallions who released it as their second single in 1966. Peaking at #17 on the U.S. Billboard Hot 100, the recording became a hit although banned on many radio stations due to lines referring to drinking and sex: "worst hangover I ever had" and  "she loved me so hard".

The song has since been recorded by numerous artists including the Residents on the album Third Reich & Roll, Joe Stampley, and the Cockroaches.

List of versions

References

External links
[ Allmusic.com: Double Shot (Of My Baby's Love)]
Louisiana Music Hall of Fame: Cyril Vetter

1963 songs
1966 singles
Joe Stampley songs
The Cockroaches songs
Smash Records singles
Songs about alcohol